is a railway station in Yamatotakada, Nara Prefecture, Japan.

Lines
Kintetsu Railway
Minami Osaka Line

Layout
The station has  two side platforms and two tracks

Adjacent stations

External links
 Takadashi Station (Kintetsu Corporation) (Japanese)

Railway stations in Japan opened in 1929
Railway stations in Nara Prefecture